The Chukchi, or Chukchee (Ḷygʺoravètḷʹèt, O'ravètḷʹèt), are a Siberian indigenous people native to the Chukchi Peninsula, the shores of the Chukchi Sea and the Bering Sea region of the Arctic Ocean all within modern Russia. They speak the Chukchi language. The Chukchi originated from the people living around the Okhotsk Sea. According to several studies on genomic research conduct from 2014 to 2018, the Chukchi are one of the Indigenous peoples of Siberia, they are also the closest Asiatic relatives of the indigenous peoples of the Americas as well as of the Ainu people and other East Asian people, being the descendants of settlers who did not cross the Bering Strait or settle the Japanese archipelago.

Cultural history

The majority of Chukchi reside within Chukotka Autonomous Okrug, but some also reside in the neighboring Sakha Republic to the west, Magadan Oblast to the southwest, and Kamchatka Krai to the south. Some Chukchi also reside in other parts of Russia, as well as in Europe and North America. The total number of Chukchi in the world slightly exceeds 16,000.

The Chukchi are traditionally divided into the Maritime Chukchi, who had settled homes on the coast and lived primarily from sea mammal hunting, and the Reindeer Chukchi, who lived as nomads in the inland tundra region, migrating seasonally with their herds of reindeer. The Russian name "Chukchi" is derived from the Chukchi word Chauchu ("rich in reindeer"), which was used by the 'Reindeer Chukchi' to distinguish themselves from the 'Maritime Chukchi,' called Anqallyt ("the sea people"). Their name for a member of the Chukchi ethnic group as a whole is Luoravetlan (literally 'genuine person').

In Chukchi religion, every object, whether animate or inanimate, is assigned a spirit. This spirit can be either harmful or benevolent. Some of Chukchi myths reveal a dualistic cosmology.

After the collapse of the Soviet Union, the state-run farms were reorganized and nominally privatized. This process was ultimately destructive to the village-based economy in Chukotka. The region has still not fully recovered. Many rural Chukchi, as well as Russians in Chukotka's villages, have survived in recent years only with the help of direct humanitarian aid. Some Chukchi have attained university degrees, becoming poets, writers, politicians, teachers and doctors.

Subsistence

In prehistoric times, the Chukchi engaged in nomadic hunter gatherer modes of existence. In current times, there continue to be some elements of subsistence hunting, including that of polar bears, seals, walruses, whales, and reindeer. However, there are some differences between the traditional lifestyles of the coastal and inland Chukchi. The former (coastal Chukchi) were largely settled fishers and hunters (mainly of sea mammals). The inland Chukchi were partial reindeer herders.

Beginning in the 1920s, the Soviets organized the economic activities of both coastal and inland Chukchi and eventually established 28 collectively run, state-owned enterprises in Chukotka. All of these were based on reindeer herding, with the addition of sea mammal hunting and walrus ivory carving in the coastal areas. Chukchi were educated in Soviet schools and today are almost 100% literate and fluent in the Russian language. Only a portion of them today work directly in reindeer herding or sea mammal hunting, and continue to live a nomadic lifestyle in yaranga tents.

Relations with Russians
Russians first began contacting the Chukchi when they reached the Kolyma River (1643) and the Anadyr River (1649). The route from Nizhnekolymsk to the fort at Anadyrsk along the southwest of the main Chukchi area became a major trade route. The overland journey from Yakutsk to Anadyrsk took about six months.

The Chukchi were generally ignored for the next fifty years because they were warlike and did not provide furs or other valuable commodities to tax. Armed skirmishes flared up around 1700 when the Russians began operating in the Kamchatka Peninsula and needed to protect their communications from the Chukchi and Koryak. The first attempt to conquer them was made in 1701. Other expeditions were sent out in 1708, 1709 and 1711 with considerable bloodshed but little success and unable to eliminate the local population on the large territory. War was renewed in 1729, when the Chukchi defeated an expedition from Okhotsk and killed its commander. Command passed to Major Dmitry Pavlutsky, who adopted very destructive tactics, burning, killing, driving off reindeer, and capturing and killing women and children. In 1742, the government at Saint Petersburg ordered another war in which the Chukchi and Koryak were to be "totally extirpated". The war (1744–7) was conducted with similar brutality and ended when Pavlutsky was killed in March 1747. It is said that the Chukchi kept his head as a trophy for a number of years. The Russians waged war again in the 1750s, but a part of Chukchi people did survive this extermination plans on the very far North East (see on the right a map for population territories during the extermination activity by Russian empire).

In 1762 with a new ruler, Saint Petersburg adopted a different policy. Maintaining the fort at Anadyrsk had cost some 1,380,000 rubles, but the area had returned only 29,150 rubles in taxes, so the government abandoned Anadyrsk in 1764. The Chukchi, no longer attacked by the Russian Empire, began to trade peacefully with the Russians. From 1788, they participated in an annual trade fair on the lower Kolyma. Another was established in 1775 on the Angarka, a tributary of the Bolshoy Anyuy River. This trade declined in the late 19th century when American whalers and others began landing goods on the coast. The first Orthodox missionaries entered Chukchi territory some time after 1815. And the strategy worked. Trade began to flourish between the Cossacks and the Chukchi. with annual trade fairs, where goods were exchanged, were set up and the two peoples were finally speaking the same language. The natives, however, never paid yasak, and their status as subjects was little more than a formality. The formal annexation of the Chukotka Peninsula did not happen until much later, during the time of the Soviet Union.

Soviet period
Apart from four Orthodox schools, there were no schools in the Chukchi land until the late 1920s. In 1926, there were 72 literate Chukchis. The Soviets introduced a Latin alphabet in 1932, replacing it with Cyrillic in 1937. In 1934, 71% of the Chukchis were nomadic. In 1941, 90% of the reindeer were still privately owned. So-called kulaks roamed with their private herds up into the 1950s. After 1990 and the fall of the Soviet Union, there was a major exodus of Russians from the area because of underfunding the local industry.

Population estimates from Forsyth:
 1700: 6,000
 1800: 8,000–9,000
 1926: 13,100
 1930s: 12,000
 1939: 13,900
 1959: 11,700
 1979: at least 13,169

Jokes regarding

Chukchi jokes are a form of ethnic humor. They are portrayed as primitive yet clever in a naive way.

References

Further reading

External links

 
 
 
 
 

 
Indigenous peoples in the Arctic
Eskimos
Ethnic groups in Russia
Ethnic groups in Siberia
Indigenous peoples of North Asia
Indigenous small-numbered peoples of the North, Siberia and the Far East
Modern nomads
Nomadic groups in Eurasia
People from Chukotka Autonomous Okrug
Bering Sea
Chukchi Sea
Chukotka Autonomous Okrug